Per Örjan Persson (27 August 1942) is a Swedish former football player. He played for Scottish clubs Dundee United and Rangers in the 1960s. He also represented Sweden at the 1970 FIFA World Cup in Mexico and the European Championship qualifiers in 1964.

Career 
Persson was the first of five Scandinavian imports signed by Dundee United manager Jerry Kerr who was one of the first managers in Scotland to tap into the Scandinavian market to find talented and experienced players at an affordable price. Persson moved to Tannadice from Örgryte IS on 2 December 1964, the first overseas player to join the club. As there was no professionalism in Swedish football in the 1960s United did not have to pay a transfer fee. He made his debut along with the Danish striker Finn Døssing. United had made a poor start to the 1964-65 First Division season and appeared to be heading towards relegation, which would have undone the great work done by Kerr since leading the team to promotion in 1959-60. Since then the club had enjoyed their longest ever spell in the top flight and were becoming established as a permanent fixture in the First Division although relegation in the Spring of 1965 may have doomed the club to obscurity.

Kerr had taken a gamble in bringing players with no experience in Scottish football, like Mogens Berg and Lennart Wing, to the club to help fight relegation. The gamble paid off, and Persson’s classy play on the wing and pinpoint crosses being complementary to Døssing's huge goal scoring talent. United managed mid-table security by the end of the season. In the following 1965-66 season Persson played a crucial role in helping United to finish in 5th place in the league qualifying for Europe for the first time. The 1966-67 was to be Persson's last at Tannadice, but arguably his most successful. Scoring 11 goals in 29 appearances from the wing as well as helping United to two victories over FC Barcelona and one over Juventus in the Fairs Cup.

Persson was immensely popular at United playing in 101 matches and scoring 17 goals. He has the distinction (shared with fellow countryman Lennart Wing) of being the first Dundee United player to win a full international cap. He won a total of 9 Sweden caps while with United.

He moved to Rangers in May 1967 where he played 113 games, scored 31 goals (often spectacular ones) and won 6 caps, representing his country at the World Cup in 1970. Later that year he returned to Örgryte IS and went on to play for Sweden at the 1974 World Cup.

References

External links
Orjan Persson, Neil Brown

1942 births
Living people
People from Uddevalla Municipality
Dundee United F.C. players
Rangers F.C. players
Örgryte IS players
Swedish footballers
Sweden international footballers
1970 FIFA World Cup players
1974 FIFA World Cup players
Expatriate footballers in Scotland
Allsvenskan players
Scottish Football League players
Swedish expatriate sportspeople in Scotland
Association football midfielders
Swedish expatriate footballers
Sportspeople from Västra Götaland County